George 'Dod' Brewster (7 October 1891 – after 1924) was a Scottish former professional football centre-half who played for Aberdeen, Everton, and Wolverhampton Wanderers.

Club career

Aberdeen
Brewster made his Aberdeen debut in a game against Celtic in 1913. After playing over 100 games for Aberdeen, he moved to Everton in 1920.

Everton
After signing for Everton for what was said to be a 'record fee', Brewster made 68 appearances for the club before joining Wolverhampton Wanderers.

Wolverhampton Wanderers
Brewster joined Wolves in 1922 and left after just 16 games.

Later career
George Brewster went on to play for Lovells Athletic in Wales, Wallasey Athletic, Brooklyn Athletic in New York (March–June 1924), and had a spell as player/manager at Caledonian.

International career
Brewster was capped once for Scotland on 9 April 1921 against England.

Military career
Sapper George Brewster served with the Royal Engineers in World War One, and was awarded the Military Medal in 1918.

References

External links
AFC Heritage Trust profile

1891 births
People from Aberdeenshire
Scottish footballers
Association football central defenders
Aberdeen F.C. players
Everton F.C. players
Wolverhampton Wanderers F.C. players
Scotland international footballers
Scottish Football League players
English Football League players
Caledonian F.C. players
Year of death missing